James Terry White (July 3, 1845 in Newburyport, Massachusetts – April 3, 1920 in Manhattan, New York) was an American publisher and poet.  Given his wide range of interests and involvement in various businesses and cultural activities, he was reputed to be a Renaissance man.  In 1862, he joined the San Francisco publishing firm H.H. Bancroft & Co.  In 1869, White founded a publishing company bearing his name, James T. White Co. in San Francisco; and in 1886, with his son George Derby White, moved its headquarters to New York City.  The firm published the first edition of The National Cyclopaedia of American Biography in 1891.  At the death of his son in 1939, thirty-one volumes had been published, each containing about 1,000 biographies and 450 pages.

Family successor of corporate positions 
White's uncle, Andrew Judson White, MD (1824–1898), had entered the wholesale drug business in New York and London — mainly, he, along with two other family members, obtained the rights to Dr. Morse's Indian Root Pills.

In 1891, he became a large shareholder in Yost Typewriting Company, of which, later, he became president and director.  When Union acquired Yost, he became a director of the Union Typewriting Co.  When Andrew J. White died in 1898, his son, Raymond Sanford White (a Yale graduate) assumed those roles.  When Raymond White died in 1903, James Terry White (his cousin), assumed the role as president of the Yost Typewriting Company, president and director of the Onondaga Mining Company, president and director of Sulphrose Company, president and director of West Coast Rubber Company.  He also became a stockholder in several banks and other business corporations of New York City.

Other affiliations 
He had served as vice president of the National Press Bureau.  White was an organizer and vice president of the Hudnut Pharmacy in New York City.  He founded the Character Development League in New York City and, in 1885, invented White’s Physiological Manikin, a life-size illustration of human anatomical structure, surgical techniques, and even prenatal development despite the gender being male.

Selected publications 
As author
 Flowers from Arcadia (1884) 
 A Bouquet of California Flowers (1883) 
 Captive Memories (1897) 
 Christmas Greeting (1883) 
 A Garden of Remembrance (1917) 

As publisher
 The National Cyclopaedia of American Biography, 63 volumes, published from 1892 to 1984

References 
General references

Inline citations

External links

 Macbeth Gallery Records, 1838-1968, bulk, 1892-1953, Archives of American Art, Smithsonian Institution
 James T. White & Co., 1916–1932, box 48

1845 births
1920 deaths
19th-century American poets
American male poets
American publishers (people)
19th-century American male writers